William Devereux was an Anglo-Norman nobleman living during the reigns of kings William I, William II, and Henry I of England. The Devereux, along with the Baskervilles and Pichards, were prominent knightly families along the Welsh marches at the beginning of the twelfth century, and linked to the Braose and Lacy lordships of the region. William Devereux's descendants would later give rise to the Devereux family of Hereford, and the Devereux Viscounts of Hereford and Earls of Essex.

Career
Following the Norman conquest of England, William Devereux was granted lands along the Welsh Marches in Herefordshire, Shropshire, and Gloucester as a member of the retinue of Walter de Lacy. Shortly after the Battle of Hastings rebellion broke out along the Welsh marches. Devereux probably participated in efforts to counter the attacks of Eadric the Wild and the Welsh on Hereford. In 1069, Walter de Lacy countered an attack and then led a retaliatory raid into Wales.  Eadric the Wild burned Shrewsbury, but unsuccessfully besieged its castle. Late in 1069 King William led the local forces in defeating Eadric the Wild at the Battle of Stafford, and forcing his submission in 1070.

In 1075 the Revolt of the Earls broke out against King William’s rule. It was led by Roger de Breteuil, earl of Hereford; Ralph, earl of East Anglia; and Waltheof, Earl of Northumbria. Walter de Lacy, and probably William Devereux as part of his retinue, played a critical role in preventing the earl of Hereford’s forces linking up with the other rebels, which lead to the collapse of the revolt.

William Devereux probably would have attended the king as he spent Christmas of 1080 at Gloucester. Devereux would have been expected to participate in king William’s movement into Wales in 1081, which may have been a military raid to quell local resistance.

William Devereux’s son, Walter Devereaux, began training as a knight about 1084 in the retinue of Walter de Lacy. Following Walter de Lacy’s sudden death on 25 March 1085, the allegiance of the family was transferred to Walter de Lacy’s son, Roger de Lacy.

At Domesday in 1086 William Devereux held lands along the Welsh Marches. Lyonshall was held by William's son, Walter Devereux, and Lyonshall Castle was constructed at the direction of his overlord, Roger de Lacy during the early 1090's.

William was a benefactor of the Abbey at Gloucester (Church of St. Peter in Gloucester). In 1086 William the Conqueror issued a charter to the abbey confirming the land it possessed, and William Devereux was identified as giving 1 hide of land. During the time of King William Rufus in 1096 he was identified as granting a hide in Herefordshire, and two tenths (duas decimas) from 'Leech and Hadrop'. A list of donations to the abbey showed William Devereux giving one hide of land in Jerchenfeld, Westone, and tithes from Haythrop, in the time of Abbot Serlo (1072 to 1104). Other sources indicate he confirmed the grant of a hide in Herefordshire to St. Peter’s Abbey at Gloucester in the tenth year of Henry I (1110). During the time of Abbot William (1113 to 1130) a woman named Hawise, identified as the widow of William Devereux, appeared on a list of donations as giving the land called Hyde, and that Walter de Lacy had given this to her upon her marriage. The gift of William Devereux of one hide of land to the abbey was confirmed again by King Stephen in 1138, the Archbishop of Canterbury between 1139 and 1148, and King Henry II about 1174.

William Devereux's overlord, Roger de Lacy, participated in a conspiracy led by Robert de Mowbray to replace King William II with his brother, but was discovered and banished in 1095. When de Lacy was exiled Lyonshall castle came under the direct control of the Devereux family, and eventually they became its chief lords. With his feudal lord's banishment William Devereux transferred his feudal allegiance to Bernard de Neufmarché, Lord of Brecon. In 1170 a nave was constructed in Worcester Cathedral containing a stained glass window, showing Bernard de Neufmarche surrounded by 12 knights, and one bore the Devereux shield.

In 1095 King William II lost men and horses on a foray into Wales, and again led an expedition in 1097 that failed to bring the Welsh to battle. William Devereux would have been expected to participate in these ongoing Welsh border battles.

Between 1101 and Michaelmas 1102 William Devereux witnessed a charter of Henry I to the prior of St. Wulmar in Boulogne. The charter confirmed the granting of the manor of Nutfield in Surrey to the canons by Ida, Countess of Boulogne.

William witnessed an undated grant by William de Hussemain of a tenement in the manor of Castle Frome, Herefordshire, to Walter de Longchamp. Another witness to this document, Baldwyn de Boulers, was married by 1102, and signed a charter of Henry I to Shrewsbury Abbey in 1121.

William Devereux and his wife also made further grants to the church of his chapel at Putley, stating in the charter "Know all present and to come, that I, William Devereux, with the assent and advice of my wife, and my heirs, have given and granted God and St. Mary and St. Ethelbert all of my rights in the chapel of Putley." This would be confirmed by a later Dean of Hereford, 'Ralph Murdac,' who confirmed the grant, "which William Devereux, has given my predecessor."

Family
William married Hawise de Lacy, daughter of Walter de Lacy.  This marriage occurred after 1066 as her dowry included post-conquest land grants. They had issue:

Walter Devereux, Lord of Lyonshall, and a benefactor to Brecknock priory in the reign of Henry I
Gilbert Devereux, chaplain to the King and Treasurer of Normandy

Domesday landholdings
According to the Domesday Book, William Devereux held the following lands valued at about £17 12 shillings in 1086 under the tenant-in-chief Roger de Lacy:

Notes

References

Anglo-Normans
1110 deaths
Year of birth unknown
William